Hi Voltage is an album by jazz tenor saxophonist Hank Mobley recorded on October 9, 1967 and released on the Blue Note label the following year. It features performances by Mobley with alto saxophonist Jackie McLean, trumpeter Blue Mitchell, pianist John Hicks, drummer  Billy Higgins, and bassist Bob Cranshaw.

Reception
The Allmusic review by Thom Jurek awarded the album 4 stars stating "In all, this date is solid, ranking with the very best of Mobley's offerings for Blue Note."

Track listing 
All compositions by Hank Mobley
 "High Voltage" - 8:11
 "Two and One" - 6:11
 "No More Goodbyes" - 5:43
 "Advance Notice" - 5:59
 "Bossa De Luxe" - 7:33
 "Flirty Gerty" - 7:00

Personnel 
 Hank Mobley — tenor saxophone
 Jackie McLean — alto saxophone
 Blue Mitchell — trumpet
 John Hicks — piano
 Bob Cranshaw — bass
 Billy Higgins — drums

References 

1968 albums
Albums produced by Francis Wolff
Blue Note Records albums
Hank Mobley albums
Albums recorded at Van Gelder Studio